Kalie Shorr (born July 11, 1994) is an American rock and country music singer-songwriter based in Nashville, Tennessee. In 2016, her debut single "Fight Like a Girl" began to receive national attention and airplay on the SiriusXM radio station The Highway. She released her debut album, Open Book on September 27, 2019.

Personal life
Shorr grew up in Portland, Maine. She wrote her first song at age 6, and picked up the guitar for the first time at age 13. Shorr began posting covers of popular songs on YouTube when she was 13. She was also in a couple of bands, including a Nirvana Cover-band, back in Middle and High school. She visited Nashville for the first time when she was sixteen, and when she was 19, she moved to Nashville to pursue a career in country music. On March 30, 2020, Shorr announced via Twitter, that she had recently been diagnosed with COVID-19.

Career
In 2010, she was the Southern Maine winner of Maine's Got Talent. Celebrity Blogger and now friend, Perez Hilton took notice of Shorr's covers and original songs on YouTube, and invited her to perform at his birthday party in March 2012, opening for the Backstreet Boys. In March 2014, Shorr became involved in a weekly live show, Song Suffragettes, featuring only female singer-songwriters. Shorr has continued performing in the show almost every week since then, and was the first artist highlighted by Taste of Country for their Let The Girls Play campaign. Her YouTube covers continue to be successful, as did her cover of Taylor Swift's "Blank Space," highlighted by Popdust."  In February 2015, she released an EP full of demos she had recorded over her time in Nashville, named The Nashville Sessions. In 2016, her single "Fight Like a Girl" began to receive airplay on Sirius XM The Highway, and she released her debut mixtape, The Y2K Mixtape, heavily inspired by the 2000s. In May, she signed a publishing deal with the publishing company Writerslist. Shorr released her second single, titled "He's Just Not That into You" on September 30, 2016. Shorr released a five-song EP, Slingshot, in March 2017 and told Sounds Like Nashville that the project combined pop and country sounds to reflect, "huge part of my sound and how I identify myself."

Shorr released her debut album Open Book on September 27, 2019. The album was named the seventh best album of 2019 by The New York Times. She signed with New York-based tmwrk records in October, 2020. A reissue of her debut record Open Book, titled Open Book: Unabridged was released on December 4, 2020 under her new label.

Discography

Albums

Extended plays

Singles

Other appearances

Music videos

External links
Official website
YouTube channel

References

1994 births
Living people
Musicians from Portland, Maine
American women country singers
American country singer-songwriters
Country musicians from Maine
Songwriters from Maine
21st-century American singers
21st-century American women singers